Anton "Donyo" Kuzmanov (born 28 March 1918) was a Bulgarian footballer.

Club career
Donyo Kuzmanov played in a prestigious Bulgarian club FC Shipka Sofia reaching with them the third place in the 1937–38 Bulgarian championship. After winning the 1939 Bulgarian Cup Final he moved to Yugoslavia and joined Serbian club SK Jedinstvo Beograd. He was registered for Jedinstvo in November 1939. He was coached by Bane Sekulić. He also played with Jedinstvo in the 1940–41 Serbian League scoring one goal.

International career
On 2 October 1938, in Sofia, he played for the Bulgarian national team in a friendly match against Germany.

References

1918 births
Possibly living people
Bulgarian footballers
Bulgarian expatriate footballers
Association football defenders
FC Shipka Sofia players
First Professional Football League (Bulgaria) players
SK Jedinstvo Beograd players
Yugoslav First League players
Expatriate footballers in Yugoslavia
Bulgarian expatriate sportspeople in Yugoslavia